Paul Blanc (Ille-sur-Têt, 29 January 1937) was a member of the Senate of France since 1992, and re-elected in 2001, representing to 2011 the Pyrénées-Orientales department.  He was a member of the Union for a Popular Movement. He was also the mayor of Prades then of Sournia, in Pyrénées-Orientales.

References
 Page on the Senate website

1937 births
Living people
Union for a Popular Movement politicians
French Senators of the Fifth Republic
Senators of Pyrénées-Orientales